6Y or 6-Y may refer to:

6 years
6Y, the call sign prefix for radio stations in Jamaica
6Y, Aircraft registration for Jamaica
6Y, the IATA airline code for the Latvian company SmartLynx Airlines
6Y, a model of Škoda Fabia engine
6Y, the production code for the 1985 Doctor Who serial Timelash

See also
Y6 (disambiguation)